The Akanigui (also Kanigui or Bakaniki) are an ethnic group in Gabon. They live in the Haut-Ogooué region, northwest of Franceville.
They speak a Bantu language, the Kaningi language, whose number of speakers was estimated as 6,000 in 1990. There were about 6,000 Akanigui in Gabon in 1990.

References

Bibliography 
  David E. Gardinier, Historical dictionary of Gabon, Scarecrow Press, Metuchen, N.J ; Londres, 1981, p. 120

Ethnic groups in Gabon